Keita (written: 慶太, 敬太, 圭太 or 渓太) is a masculine Japanese given name. Notable people with the name include:

 Keita Amemiya (born 1959), Japanese anime director
, Japanese footballer
 Keita Gotō (industrialist) (1882–1959), Japanese industrialist
, Japanese footballer
 Keita Inoue, Japanese shogi player
 Keita Isozaki (born 1980), Japanese footballer
, Japanese shogi player
 Keita Kushimaumi (real name Keita Kushima) (born 1965), Japanese sumo wrestler and coach
 , Japanese actor
 Keita Masuda (born 1979), Japanese badminton player
, Japanese mixed martial artist
, Japanese footballer
, Japanese curler
 Keita Soraoka (born 1971), Japanese former Olympic swimmer
 Keita Sugimoto (born 1982), Japanese footballer
 Keita Suzuki (born 1981), Japanese footballer
 Keita Tachibana (born 1985), Japanese musician (w-inds.)
 Keita Takahashi (born 1974 or 1975), Japanese video game director
, Japanese speed skater
 Keita Yano (born 1988), Japanese professional wrestler
 Keita Terazono (born 2001), Japanese singer, dancer and rapper, member of South Korean boyband  Ciipher

Other people
 Keita Baldé (born 1995), Senegalese footballer
 Keita Mandjou (born 1979), Guinean footballer
 Keita Meretana (real name Keith Mildon) (born 1932 or 1933), New Zealand former wrestler

Fictional characters

 Keita Iijima, character in the "Battle Royale" novel, film and manga series.
 Keita Suminoe, protagonist of Japanese manga and anime series "Kiss x Sis".
 Keita Amano, protagonist of the Japanese anime and manga series, "Yo-kai Watch".
 Keita Mori, character in the book "The Watchmaker of Filigree Street" by Natasha Pulley

Japanese masculine given names